Ellobium chinense is a species of small, air-breathing, snail, a terrestrial pulmonate gastropod mollusk in the family Ellobiidae.

Distribution 
This species occurs in Japan (Honshū, Kyūshū and Shikoku) and it is Vulnerable species in Japan.

References

External links 

Ellobiidae
Gastropods described in 1864